Bast may refer to:

Places
Bast, Afghanistan
Bast, Baška Voda, a village in the Split-Dalmatia County in southern Croatia
Bašť, a municipality and village in the Central Bohemian Region of the Czech Republic
Bast, Iran, a village in Bushehr Province, Iran
Bast, alternate name of Basut (disambiguation), places in Iran
Bast-e Kheyrabad, a village in Fars Province, Iran

Fiction
 Bast (Marvel Comics), Marvel Comics depiction of the goddess
 Bast, a character in the DC Comics series The Sandman
 Chief Bast, an Imperial officer from the film Star Wars
 Bast, Sadie Kane and Carter Kane's "guardian goddess" hosted from their cat Muffin from The Kane Chronicles
 The Basts, a family in E. M. Forster's 1910 novel Howards End

Other uses
 Bast (asylum) in Iranian culture
 Bast (surname)
 Bast fibre, a type of plant fibre
 Bastet or Bast, a goddess in ancient Egyptian mythology
  (BASt), the German Federal institution for road issues; see Autobahn
 Bast (botany)
 Bast (horse), a Grade I winning American thoroughbred

See also
 Bastable (disambiguation)